Dagoberto Cueto Concepción (August 14, 1937 – October 25, 2011) was a Cuban-born professional baseball player. The native of San Luis, Pinar del Río, was a right-handed pitcher whose nine-year career included seven games pitched in Major League Baseball for the 1961 Minnesota Twins.

Cueto was signed in 1956 by legendary scout Joe Cambria of the Washington Senators of 1901–1960, and was in his sixth year with the organization when he was recalled from Triple-A Syracuse during the MLB franchise's first season as the Twins. He was a starting pitcher in five of his seven Minnesota appearances, including his MLB debut on June 18, 1961, against the Chicago White Sox at Comiskey Park. Although his day began badly when he allowed two singles, a base on balls, a stolen base and a run to the first three hitters he faced, Cueto settled down and pitched into the ninth inning with a 3–1 lead. But, one out away from his first big-league victory, Cueto surrendered a game-tying home run to pinch hitter Billy Goodman and was removed from the contest. Relief pitcher Pedro Ramos then gave up a game-winning homer to eventual Baseball Hall of Famer Nellie Fox. Cueto would gain his first and only MLB win in his last game with the Twins on July 26, working a scoreless one-third of an inning against the expansion Senators of 1961–1971 and halting a five-run Washington rally to preserve Minnesota's eventual 10–9 win.

Cueto posted an MLB won–lost mark of 1–3 during his Twins' career. In 21 total MLB innings pitched, he permitted 27 hits and ten bases on balls, and struck out five.  His earned run average was a disappointing 7.17.

He died in Charlotte, North Carolina, one of his minor-league stops, at the age of 74 in 2011.

References

External links

Oxley, Burr, June 18, 1961: Goodman, Fox Win It for White Sox in 9th With Unlikely Homers (Account of Cueto's Major League Baseball debut), Society for American Baseball Research
Obituary

1937 births
2011 deaths
Asheville Tourists players
Broncos de Reynosa players
Charleston Senators players
Charlotte Hornets (baseball) players
Fort Walton Beach Jets players
Fox Cities Foxes players
Major League Baseball pitchers
Major League Baseball players from Cuba
Minnesota Twins players
Missoula Timberjacks players
Nashville Vols players
People from Pinar del Río Province
Spokane Indians players
Superior Senators players
Syracuse Chiefs players
Vancouver Mounties players
Cuban expatriate baseball players in Mexico
Cuban expatriate baseball players in the United States